City News Los Angeles (CNLA) is a weekly newspaper created in 2001 to serve the LGBT community of Los Angeles, California.

According to the official website:
 
City News LA is a news organization which covers the issues facing the LGBT (Lesbian, Gay, Bisexual and Transgender) community of Los Angeles. It is a multi-media news agency, as well as a print news organization, reporting on topics ranging from financial markets to hate crimes and political news.
The LGBT community relies on City News LA journalists to provide accurate, clearly sourced accounts of events as they occur, wherever they occur, so that individuals, organizations and citizens can make their own decisions based on the facts.
City News LA is published every week in the Los Angeles area and its website is maintained daily, with coverage available 24 hours a day, 365 days a year.

References

External links 
 City News Los Angeles website

LGBT culture in Los Angeles
LGBT-related newspapers published in the United States
Newspapers published in Greater Los Angeles
Weekly newspapers published in California